Family Dog is an adult animated series that's based on a 1987 episode of Amazing Stories, created by Brad Bird and an animated television series that aired on CBS from June 23 to July 28, 1993. It was about an average suburban family, the Binsfords, as told through the eyes of their dog named Jonah. The series was the first collaboration between executive producers Steven Spielberg and Tim Burton.

Delayed for years and panned by critics, the latter show has been called "one of the biggest fiascos in television animation history, on both a creative and commercial level, in spite (but, in many ways, because of) the high-powered talent behind the project." One critic observed that the main problem with the show was that "the Binsford family was so repulsively selfish that audience interest in their adventures was nil."

Cast and characters

1987 short
Stan Freberg as Skip Binsford, the father
Annie Potts as Bev Binsford, the mother
Brad Bird as Jonah, a Bull Terrier and the family dog
Scott Menville as Billy Binsford, the son
Brooke Ashley as Buffy Binsford, the daughter
Mercedes McCambridge as Miss Lestrange 
Marshall Efron as Burglar
Stanley Ralph Ross as Burglar
Jack Angel as Security Guard

1993 series
 Martin Mull as Skip Binsford, the father
 Molly Cheek as Bev Binsford, the mother
 Danny Mann as Jonah, a Bull Terrier and the family dog
 Zak Huxtable Epstein as Billy Binsford, the son
 Cassie Cole as Buffy Binsford, the daughter

Recurring
 Bruce McGill as Martin Mahoney
 Deanna Oliver as Trish Mahoney
 Mary Kay Bergman as Katie, a female Chihuahua and neighbor's dog

Episodes

Production

Background

In the original Amazing Stories episode, which aired in the show's second season in 1987, a dog named Jonah (a Bull Terrier simply called "the dog" who is voiced by Brad Bird) is the main character, portrayed in three stories:

The first story involves general misadventures around the house, with Jonah ignored and somewhat mistreated by his owners, originally named the Binfords (voiced by Stan Freberg, Annie Potts, Scott Menville, and Brooke Ashley).

The second part is a Christmas "home movie", narrated by the family, that culminates with Jonah eating the ham.

In the final and longest segment, a couple of burglars (voiced by Marshall Efron and Stanley Ralph Ross) break into the house while the family is out seeing a movie. When Jonah fails to protect the house from the thieves a second time, the father sends him to Gerta LeStrange's Dog Obedience School run by Gerta LeStrange (voiced by Mercedes McCambridge), so he can learn how to become a "quivering, snarling, white-hot ball of canine terror." The burglars hit the house yet again and flee from the now-aggressive dog, but return to their hideout to discover him still clamped to one thief's arm with his teeth. A police officer (voiced by Jack Angel) investigating the robberies raids the house and is immediately attacked by the dog. The burglars decide to use Jonah in their heists, earning them (and the dog) fame as the "Dog Gang." Jonah finally turns on the criminals, causing an auto accident in which they hit a police car and are busted. Jonah is returned to the Binford family, who now consider him their hero. In a final gag, the father, locked out of the house, sneaks into the backyard, where he's attacked by the dog, duly defending the property.

Written and directed by Brad Bird, with music by Danny Elfman and Steve Bartek, it was one of the most popular episodes of the Amblin Television/Universal Television weekly anthology television series, Amazing Stories. The story was animated by Dan Jeup, Ralph Eggleston, Chris Buck, Sue Kroyer, Gregg Vanzo, David Cutler, Rob Minkoff, Alan Smart, and Darrell Rooney from an animation production design by Tim Burton. The animation production was outsourced to Hyperion Pictures (then under The Kushner-Locke Company), and was shot in Sydney, Australia by Cinemagic Animated Films under animation director Cam Ford, with Kim Humphries as camera operator.

Spielberg's choice to make the episode using animation – especially combining the expense of high-quality animation with well-known voice actors – was considered risky and bold at the time. The special was later attached to the theatrical release of another Spielberg-produced project, The Land Before Time, because of the film's short length of just over an hour.

This short was the first time the Easter Egg A113 was ever used. Brad Bird used it on the license plate on the van and has since hidden it in every film he has directed. The Easter Egg has been popularized by Pixar films.

Development
Six years after the original Amazing Stories episode, a CBS series based on the episode was produced by Steven Spielberg and Tim Burton (who contributed to the production and character designs). It was written by Dennis Klein, Sherri Stoner and Paul Dini, and animated by Nelvana, but notably lacked the involvement of the original writer and director, Brad Bird, because he did not believe the short's premise would work as a television show. Largely hyped due to Spielberg's involvement, the series was plagued by production delays. It did not get past its original network order of 13 episodes. Ten episodes were finished by the Wang Film Productions animation house in Taiwan but the producers were dissatisfied with the results, so they halted production on the final three episodes and outsourced the ten episodes to Nelvana for "fixes and completions". The series was scheduled to debut on March 20, 1991 (and it was heavily promoted during the February 1991 broadcast of the Grammy Awards), but the animation was not completed in time for this premiere, so the series was ultimately pushed back until 1993. Frederick Coffin was originally cast as the voice of Skip Binsford, but Spielberg decided to replace him with Martin Mull, after animation was completed on the first three episodes.The budget for each episode rose from $650,000 to $1 million.

Despite the Amazing Stories short airing two months before the launch of the new Fox network and the original The Simpsons shorts as part of The Tracy Ullman Show, Family Dog eventually was lumped into a category of failed primetime animated series produced for the "Big Three" networks to compete with The Simpsons, alongside ABC's Capitol Critters and CBS's own Fish Police. Every program was canceled after only a few weeks. CBS burned off Family Dog in six weeks in the summer of 1993.

Home media

The entire series was released as a LaserDisc box set, and various episodes of the show were released on VHS around the same time.

Reception
The original short has been praised by critics alongside the likes of veteran animators Bill Melendez and Bob Kurtz.

When the show debuted, it was roundly panned for its crude scripts and cheap production values, both of drastically lesser quality than the episode which had spawned the series. It  became a cult disaster.

Video game
The show was adapted into a Super NES video game about the life of an everyday family dog. The player has to go three places such as the home where the dog lives, a dog pound and the woods to defeat stereotypical obstacles and enemies like a dog catcher and a cat.

References

External links

The original 1987 episode on Vimeo 
Original short on IMDb

1993 American television series debuts
1993 American television series endings
1990s American adult animated television series
1990s American animated comedy television series
1993 Canadian television series debuts
1993 Canadian television series endings
1990s Canadian adult animated television series
1990s Canadian animated comedy television series
American adult animated television spin-offs
American adult animated comedy television series
Canadian animated television spin-offs
Canadian adult animated comedy television series
English-language television shows
CBS original programming
Animated television series about dogs
Animated television series about dysfunctional families
Television series by Amblin Entertainment
Television series by Nelvana
Television series by Universal Television 
Television series by Warner Bros. Television Studios 
Television shows set in Texas